The 2009 version of the Lebanese FA Cup is the 37th edition to be played. It is the premier knockout tournament for football teams in Lebanon.

Al-Mabarrah went into this edition as the holders. Al Ansar holds the most wins with 11 titles.

The cup winner were guaranteed a place in the 2010 AFC Cup.

Round 1

18 teams play a knockout tie. 8 clubs advance to the next round, 1 club gets a bye to the 3rd round. Ties played over 11 to 15 October 2008

Round 2

8 teams play a knockout tie. 4 clubs advance to the next round. Ties played on 21 October 2008

Round 3

16 teams play a knockout tie. 8 clubs advance to the next round. Ties played over 26 & 28 December 2008

Quarter finals

8 teams play a knockout tie. 4 clubs advance to the semi finals. Ties played on 1 February 2009

Semi finals

4 teams play a knockout tie. 2 clubs advance to the Final Ties played on 24 February 2009

Final

Final played on 13 May 2009

References

Lebanese FA Cup seasons
Cup
Leb